Sandy Wu (born August 15, 1990) is a Taiwanese television host, writer, entrepreneur and former junior high school English teacher. A graduate of the University of Washington Bothell, Wu debuted her hosting career with a Yahoo! entertainment news webshow in 2013 and is a three-time Golden Bell Award winner. She is the eldest daughter of host and singer Jacky Wu.

Selected filmography

Variety show

Published works

Awards and nominations

References

External links
 
 
 Sandy Wu on Instagram

 

1990 births
Living people
Taiwanese television presenters
Taiwanese women television presenters
People from Taipei
Writers from Taipei
University of Washington alumni
21st-century Taiwanese women writers